This is a list of notable events relating to the environment in 1998. They relate to environmental law, conservation, environmentalism and environmental issues.

Events

March
The Convention for the Protection of the Marine Environment of the North-East Atlantic is enacted.

April
The Bamako Convention (in full - Bamako Convention on the ban on the Import into Africa and the Control of Transboundary Movement and Management of Hazardous Wastes within Africa) is enacted.
The Doñana disaster, an industrial accident in Andalusia (southern Spain), occurred when a holding dam burst at the Los Frailes mine near Aznalcóllar (Seville Province). It released 4–5 million cubic metres of mine tailings.

See also

Human impact on the environment
List of environmental issues